St Andrew's Church, Handsworth is a Grade I listed parish church in the Church of England in Handsworth, West Midlands.

History

The church originated as the mission church of the Good Shepherd. It opened in a temporary building in 1894 as a mission church of St. Mary's, Handsworth. The current building was designed by the architect William Bidlake in the Arts and Crafts style. Work started in 1907 and the building was completed in 1908. The church was dedicated in 1910 and it was consecrated in 1914 when a parish was assigned from St Mary's and St James'.

Organ

The church has a two manual pipe organ by William Bird and Sons of Selly Park. A specification of the organ can be found on the National Pipe Organ Register.

Choir

The church has a traditional, robed, parish Choir whose primary function is to lead the sung mass worship at the main service on Sunday at 10.00 am. The choir consists of a cross section of age groups and is structured using the traditional 'SATB' voices. The choir sing and perform  traditional, classical and modern works and rehearse and sing a liturgically suitable anthem each Sunday.

References

External links

Church of England church buildings in Birmingham, West Midlands
Grade I listed churches in the West Midlands (county)
William Bidlake buildings
Churches completed in 1909
20th-century Church of England church buildings
Arts and Crafts architecture in England
Grade I listed buildings in Birmingham
Saint Andrew
Anglo-Catholic church buildings in the West Midlands (county)